

Events
December 7 – Philadelphia crime family captain Joseph Sodano, based out of Newark, New Jersey, was shot to death for hiding money from the administration.

Arts and literature
The Funeral (film) starring Christopher Walken, Chris Penn, Vincent Gallo, Benicio del Toro and John Ventimiglia
Gotti (film) starring Armand Assante, William Forsythe, Frank Vincent, Dominic Chianese, Vincent Pastore and Tony Sirico
The Last Don (novel) by Mario Puzo
Last Man Standing (film) starring Bruce Willis, Christopher Walken and Michael Imperioli
Last Man Standing (film) 
Mad Dog Time (film) starring Gabriel Byrne, Richard Dreyfuss, Jeff Goldblum, Burt Reynolds and Billy Drago
Bound (film)
Fargo (film)
Set It Off (film)
The Substitute (film)

Births

Deaths
 March 12 – Jack "Spot" Comer, Jewish-English gangster (83)
April 13 - James "Jimmy the Gent" Burke, Lucchese Family associate known for the Lufthansa heist.
 December 7 – Joseph Sodano, Philadelphia crime family captain

References

Organized crime
Years in organized crime